Ryan Strain (born 2 April 1997) is an Australian professional footballer who plays as a right back or winger for St Mirren and the Australia national team.

Club career

Adelaide United
On 22 September 2017, Strain signed a 1-year scholarship contract with Adelaide United. 3 months later, he signed a two-year contract extension as a senior player, making him the 30th player to progress from the club's youth team to their senior team.

Maccabi Haifa
In June 2021, Strain joined Israeli club Maccabi Haifa.

St Mirren
In June 2022, Strain joined Scottish club St Mirren on a two-year deal, following the expiry of his contract at Israeli side Maccabi Haifa. His grandfather Gerry Baker played for the Paisley club between 1958 and 1960.

International career

Youth
Strain was called up to an Australian under-20 squad in August 2015.

In November 2020, Strain was called up to the Australian under-23 team for friendlies against A-League sides. He made his debut on 17 November 2020 in a practice match against the new expansion A-League club Macarthur FC.

Senior
Strain was called up to the Australian senior national team in August 2021 for 2022 World Cup qualifiers against China and Vietnam. Strain did not feature in either game, with media reports suggesting that he had injured his hamstring.

Strain was again called up to the Australian squad in September 2022 for two friendly matches against New Zealand in the leadup to the 2022 FIFA World Cup. He made his debut for Australia in the second game, a 2–0 win, as a second-half substitute.

Personal life
Strain is the son of English athlete Lorraine Baker and the grandson of American-born footballer Gerry Baker, who also played for Saint Mirren.

Career statistics

Club

Honours
Adelaide United
 FFA Cup: 2018, 2019

Maccabi Haifa
 Toto Cup: 2021–22
 Israel Super Cup: 2021

References

External links

1997 births
Living people
Australian soccer players
Australian expatriate sportspeople in England
English footballers
English emigrants to Australia
Association football fullbacks
Aston Villa F.C. players
Adelaide United FC players
Maccabi Haifa F.C. players
St Mirren F.C. players
National Premier Leagues players
A-League Men players
Israeli Premier League players
Scottish Professional Football League players
Expatriate footballers in Israel
English expatriate sportspeople in Israel
Australian expatriate sportspeople in Israel
English people of Scottish descent
Australian people of Scottish descent
Australia international soccer players